The 2019 FIG World Cup circuit in Rhythmic Gymnastics is a series of competitions officially organized and promoted by the International Gymnastics Federation.

With stopovers in Europe and Asia, the World Cup competitions are scheduled for April 5–7 in Pesaro (ITA), April 12–14 in Sofia (BUL), April 19–21 in Tashkent (UZB), April 26–28 in Baku (AZE). World Challenge Cup competitions are scheduled for May 3–5 in Guadalajara (ESP), August 16–18 in Minsk (BLR), August 26–28 in Cluj Napoca (ROU), August 30–September 1 in Kazan (RUS), September 6–8 in Portimão (POR).

Formats

Medal winners

All-around

Individual

Group

Apparatus

Hoop

Ball

Clubs

Ribbon

5 balls

4 clubs and 3 hoops

Overall medal table

See also
 2019 Rhythmic Gymnastics World Championships
 2019 FIG Artistic Gymnastics World Cup series

References

Rhythmic Gymnastics World Cup
Rhythmic Gymnastics World Cup